Homeodomain-interacting protein kinase 2 is an enzyme that in humans is encoded by the HIPK2 gene. HIPK2 can be categorized as  a Serine/Threonine Protein kinase, specifically one that interacts with homeodomain transcription factors. It belongs to a family of protein kinases known as the DYRK kinases. Within this family HIPK2  belongs to a group of homeodomain-interacting protein kinases (HIPKs), including HIPK1 and HIPK3. HIPK2 can be found in a wide variety of species and its functions in gene expression and apoptosis are regulated by several different mechanisms.

Discovery
HIPK2 was discovered concurrently with HIPKs 1 and 3 in 1998. The HIPKs were discovered during an experiment that tried to identify genes that when expressed, yielded products that interacted with transcription factors related to the NK homeodomain . HIPKs were discovered using a technique called Two-hybrid screening. Two-hybrid screening is in conjunction with cDNA cloning, in which embryonic mouse cDNA libraries were used with mouse homeoprotein Nkx-1.2 to find genes involved with homeodomain transcription factors. The researchers found two clones that were similar in protein sequence, demonstrated a strong interaction with the homeoprotein, and an active site characteristic of protein kinases. These characteristics led to the name "HIPK". In 2000, the location of the HIPK2 gene was discovered to be on the long arm of Chromosome 7 (human) in the human genome. In mice, HIPK2 was discovered to be on Chromosome 6.

Homology
There is evidence to suggest that HIPKs including HIPK2 are evolutionarily conserved proteins across a wide array of species. The human sequence shares a close similarity to a sequence from the genome of Caenorhabditis elegans. HIPKs also share a close similarity with YAK1 in yeast and are in the same family as a kinase from Dictyostelium. Furthermore, HIPKs are able to interact with homeoproteins from other species, such as NK-1 and NK-3 in Drosophila as well as Nkx-2.5 in mice. HIPK2 can also be found in dogs, cats, sheep, and zebrafish as well as many other species.

Localization

Expression in tissues
HIPK2 is expressed in nearly all tissue types, however it is highly expressed in the heart, muscle and kidneys. HIPK2 has been shown to be expressed at the highest levels in the brain and neuronal tissues. In addition to adult tissues, HIPK2 is also expressed late in the development of the Human embryo, specifically in the retina, muscles, and neural tissues.

Sub-cellular localization
HIPK2 is found in the nucleus within structures called nuclear speckles. It is also associated with PML bodies, which are also structures found in the nucleus. Despite being found predominately in the nucleus, HIPK2 can also be Cytoplasmic.

Structure

Gene
The HIPK2 gene contains 13 exons and 13 introns within the entire 59.1 Kilo-base pair sequence. Along with the other HIPKs, it contains three conserved sequences: a protein kinase domain, an interaction domain, a PEST sequence, and a YH domain. Alternative splicing produces three different messenger RNAs, which subsequently lead to the production of three  Protein isoforms.

Protein
The HIPK2 protein is 1198 amino acids in length and has a molecular weight of 130.97 kilodaltons. The most abundant amino acids in the protein are serine, threonine and alanine, which make up approximately 30 percent of the proteins total amino acid count. The structure of the protein in its native form is unstable. The protein is made up of several regions which directly relate to its function, regulation, and localization. The protein kinase domain is 330 amino acids long and is located near the N-terminus of the protein. In addition to its kinase domain, HIPK2 has two nuclear localization signals, a SUMO interaction motif, an auto-inhibitory domain a transcriptional co-repression domain, and several interaction domains, including one for p53. While there are signals targeting HIPK2 to nuclear speckles, there is also a speckle retention sequence that causes HIPK2 to remain in the nuclear speckles. The auto-inhibitory domain, which contains an ubiquitylation site at the K1182 residue is located at the C-terminus.

Function 
HIPK2 has two major functions. It acts as a co-repressor for NK homeodomain transcription factors, increasing their DNA binding affinity and their repressive effect on transcription. HIPK2 participates in the regulation of gene expression through its contribution to regulating homeobox genes. These genes encode transcription factors that act to regulate target genes.  HIPK2 also acts in signal transduction, specifically the pathway leading to programmed cell death (apoptosis). HIPK2 can promote apoptosis either in association with p53 or by a separate mechanism. HIPK2 phosphorylates the S46 residue of p53, leading to its activation, which in turn leads to the transcription of factors that induce apoptosis. Phosphorylation of p53 by HIPK2 prevents the association of negative regulator Mdm2 to p53 and is necessary for the acetylation of the K382 residue in p53, which  also serves as a functionally important modification. Proper folding of p53 is essential for p53 function. The folding of p53 depends on the presence of zinc, and HIPK2 plays a role in zinc regulation. Consequently, the absence of HIPK2 leads to p53  misfolding. HIPK2 indirectly enhances p53 activity by phosphorylating negative regulators of p53, such as CtBP1 and Mdm2, leading to their degradation by the proteasome. HIPK2 also has the ability to regulate cellular response to reactive oxygen species by regulating the expression of both oxidant and antioxidant genes.

Regulation
HIPK2 is regulated by other proteins, as well as cellular conditions and post-translational modifications.

Positive
Under conditions of DNA damage, HIPK2 is stabilized and subject to positive regulation. The activity of HIPK2 is increased through the action of caspase 6. Caspase 6 cleaves HIPK2 at residue D916 and D977. As a result, the auto-inhibitory domain is removed and the activity of HIPK2 increases. HIPK2 activity can also be increased through the action of checkpoint kinases. These kinases phosphorylate HIPK2 associated ubiquitin ligases and prevent their binding to HIPK2. As a result, the degradation of HIPK2 through the  ubiquitin proteasome pathway is inhibited. In conditions of oxidative stress, sumoylation of HIPK2 prevents acetylation, and as a result maintains its function in facilitating apoptosis. Under normal physiological conditions however, acetylation of HIPK2 by a protein called p300 again stabilizes HIPK2 but, increases its ability to induce apoptosis. Phosphorylation of HIPK2 at residues T880 and S882, via another kinase or through auto-phosphorylation, leads to the recruitment of PIN1 and stabilization of HIPK2. This results in increased apoptotic function of HIPK2.

Negative
Under regular conditions HIPK2 is unstable and is subject to negative regulation. HIPK2 is subject to regulation by the ubiquitin proteasome pathway, in which ubiquitin ligases bind to HIPK2, leading to polyubiquitination at the K1182 residue, localization to the proteasome and subsequent degradation of the protein. leads to protein degradation. The PEST sequence found in HIPK2 is also linked to protein degradation. HIPK2 activity can also be down regulated by the protein HMGA1, which transports it back to the cytoplasm. In conditions of oxidative stress sumoylation of HIPK2 is discouraged and acetylation is promoted, resulting in its stabilization and the inhibition of its ability to facilitate apoptosis.

p53
p53 regulates HIPK2 using both positive and negative mechanisms. p53 binds to the third intron of the caspase 6 gene, and promotes the activation of the gene. Caspase 6 in turn activates HIPK2. Conversely, p53 down regulates HIPK2 by activating the ubiquitin ligase mdm2. An interaction of mdm2 and HIPK2 leads to the ubiquitination and eventual degradation of HIPK2.

Mutations
Two mutations have been discovered in the speckle retention sequence, both of which are missense. One of which was named R868W, meaning that at residue 868 where the wild type amino acid sequence would have contained an arginine residue, it now contains a tryptophan residue. The other mutation was named N958I, meaning that at residue 958 where the wild type amino acid sequence would have contained an asparagine residue, it now contains an isoleucine residue. The R868W mutation is the result of cytosine to thymine point mutation and the N985I mutation resulted from an adenine to thymine point mutation. The R868W mutation was found in exon 12 and the N985I mutation was found in exon 13. These mutations lead to forms of HIPK2 that are less active and show abhorrent localization to nuclear speckles. The speckle retention sequence is necessary for HIPK2 function in transcription activation as deletion of this sequence inhibits the function.

Interactions 

HIPK2 interacts with several other proteins:
 CREB binding protein
 p53
 p300
 SKI protein
 TP53INP1
 ATM kinase
 PIN1
 HMGA1
 SIAH1
 WSB1
 caspase 6
 Tachykinin receptor 3
 Mdm2
 CtBP

Clinical significance 
Improper HIPK2 function has been implicated in the pathology of diseases such as acute myeloid leukemia, myelodysplastic syndrome through mutations in the speckle retention sequence and Alzheimer's disease through hyperdegradation of HIPK2. Consistent with its tissue expression patterns, loss of HIPK2 function has also been implicated in kidney fibrosis and cardiovascular disease.

References

Further reading

External links 
 https://www.proteinatlas.org/ENSG00000064393-HIPK2/tissue#gene_information